Lycomimus formosus is a species of beetle in the family Cerambycidae. It was described by Chemsak and Linsley in 1984. It is known from Panama.

References

Hemilophini
Beetles described in 1984